Glossop North End A.F.C. is an English football club based in Glossop, Derbyshire.  Former members of the Football League, the club's first team currently play in the Northern Premier League Division One North. They play their home matches at Surrey Street, which has a capacity of 2,374 (209 seated, 2,165 standing). The team play in blue, and are known as the "Hillmen". Between 1899 and 1992 the club was known simply as Glossop.

Key

Key to league record:
P – Played
W – Games won
D – Games drawn
L – Games lost
F – Goals for
A – Goals against
Pts – Points
Pos – Final position

Key to colours and symbols:

Key to leagues:
North Cheshire – North Cheshire League
Combination – The Combination
Midland – Midland Football League
Division 1 – Football League First Division
Division 2 – Football League Second Division
Lanc Comb – Lancashire Combination
Manchester – Manchester League
Cheshire – Cheshire County League
NWCFL – North West Counties League
NPL – Northern Premier League

Key to rounds:
X Prem –  Extra Preliminary Round
Prem   –  Preliminary Round
1st Q  –  1st Qualifying Round
2nd Q  –  2nd Qualifying Round
3rd Q  –  3rd Qualifying Round
4th Q  –  4th Qualifying Round
1st R  –  1st Round
2nd R  –  2nd Round
3rd R  –  3rd Round
4th R  –  4th Round
Quarter-  Quarter final
Final  –  Final
r      –  replay

Seasons

References
GNE official Website

Glossop North End A.F.C.
Glossop